Demetrio Santaella (ca. 1807 – ca. 1887) was Mayor of Ponce, Puerto Rico, from 22 January 1867 to 31 December 1868.

Mayoral term
While acting as the maximum civil authority in Ponce during most of the year in 1867 and the entire year in 1868, Santaella was titled a "corregidor". As such, he performed as the local administrative and judicial official in the municipality. The position of corregidor obligated him to act as representative of the royal jurisdiction over the "Villa de Ponce" and its municipal area. Santaella took over leadership of the town from Spanish Colonel Enrique O'Neil and, at the end of his term, handed over leadership to Spanish Colonel Elicio Berriz. 

Santaella mayored the city during the 1868 Spanish Revolution.

See also

 List of Puerto Ricans
 List of mayors of Ponce, Puerto Rico

References

Further reading
 Ramon Marin. Las Fiestas Populares de Ponce. Editorial Universidad de Puerto Rico. 1994.

External links
 Guardia Civil española (c. 1898) (Includes military ranks in 1880s Spanish Empire.)

Mayors of Ponce, Puerto Rico
1800s births
1880s deaths
Year of death uncertain
Year of birth uncertain